Esmeray Diriker (25 February 1949 – 25 March 2002) was an Afro-Turkish singer.

Biography
Esmeray, who was of Afro-Turkish descent was born in the Emirgan district of Istanbul. Her father, Nusret, was a member of a Moroccan family that settled in Turkey during the Ottoman Empire, her mother Fermet is white.  In 1960, Esmeray dropped out of her last year of Emirgan Secondary School, to join the Istanbul community theatre, and performed on stage for the first time in a children's play. She continued to perform at the Istanbul community theatre until 1965. After that, she went on to performing at bigger, more noted theatres, beginning in Dün Gece Yolda Giderken Çok Komik Birşey Oldu (Last Night Something Really Funny Happened on the Streets) at the Dormen Theatre. She also performed in Avni Dilligil, Özlem, Özlem Taşdelenler, and Sezer Sezin theatres. She starred in her last theatrical production in 1974, alongside Muammer Karaca in Mart Bakanı. She then moved on to cinematic productions, and the same year, starred in Sev Kardeşim and Zilli Nazife, also making a guest appearance in Unutama Beni.

Esmeray started singing as an amateur in a choir produced by Neriman Altındağ Tüfekçi. She was the wife of Şemi Diriker (alias "Erol Tanır"), a Turkish composer. She returned to the theatre at Nedim Saban theatre in 1995 with Oscar. She performed in series of Alıştık Artık with Ayşegül Atik and Ali Atik in the first half of the 1990s and Reyting Hamdi with Hamdi Alkan from the second half of the 1990s until 2002. Her final performance was in Küçük Besleme as "Şule" in 2001.

She died of brain cancer in 2002.

Discography

45rpm
 100 Kere 1000 Kere – Sen (1973)
 Unutama Beni – Ayrılık Olsa Bile (1974)
 Elveda Yavrularım – İlk Muhabbet (1975)
 Antalya'ya Koş – Antalya'ya Koş (Enstrümantal) (1975) (with Ali Kocatepe, İlhan İrem, Seyyal Taner and Gökben)
 Soruyor Musun? – Garip Aman (1975)
 13, 5 – Büyümsün (1975)
 Oylum Oylum – Bir Gün Gelecek (1976)
 Gel Tezkere Gel – Yollara Düştüm (1977)
 Yollar Yollar – Lanet (1977)
 İnsanız Biz (1978) (with Ertan Anapa, Funda Anapa, İskender Doğan, Kerem Yılmazer and Melike Demirağ)

LPs and other albums
 Yayınlanamaz (1976)
 Yaz Romancı (1977)
 Oğlum (1980)
 Süpriz 81 (1981)
 Kağıt Mendil (1993)
 Eski Dostlar (2000)
 Unutama Beni (2003, after her death)
 Askerin Türküsü (2008, after her death)

References

1949 births
2002 deaths
20th-century Turkish women singers
Deaths from brain cancer in Turkey